Thomas Jacobsen (born 16 September 1983) is a Norwegian footballer, most recently playing for Bodø/Glimt in the Eliteserien.

Career
He transferred to Lyn from Bodø/Glimt before the 2009 season.

Career statistics

Club

References

Sportspeople from Bodø
Norwegian footballers
FK Bodø/Glimt players
Lyn Fotball players

Association football defenders

1983 births

Living people